The Aliens of Earth is a collection of science fiction stories by American writer Nancy Kress. It was released in 1993 and was the author's first book published by Arkham House . It was published in an edition of 3,520 copies. Most of the stories originally appeared in Isaac Asimov's Science Fiction Magazine.

Contents

The Aliens of Earth contains the following stories:

 "The Price of Oranges"
 "Glass"
 "People Like Us"
 "Cannibals"
 "To Scale"
 "Touchdown"
 "Down Behind Cuba Lake"
 "In A World Like This"
 "Philippa's Hands"
 "Inertia"
 "Phone Repairs"
 "The Battle of Long Island"
 "Renaissance"
 "Spillage"
 "The Mountain to Mohammed"
 "Craps"
 "And Wild For To Hold"
 "In Memoriam"

Sources

External links 
 

1993 short story collections
Science fiction short story collections
Works originally published in Asimov's Science Fiction
Arkham House books
Works by Nancy Kress